Sinamiidae is an extinct family of ray-finned fish. They are halecomorph fishes endemic to Early Cretaceous freshwater environments in eastern Asia.

Along with Amiidae, it is one of two families that makes up the superfamily Amioidea. The two are distinguished by the shape of their scales.

References 

Amiiformes
Prehistoric ray-finned fish families
Cretaceous bony fish
Early Cretaceous fish of Asia